Vincent Zhu Wei-Fang (December 10, 1927 – September 7, 2016) was a Chinese Catholic bishop.

Ordained to the priesthood in 1954, Zhu Weifang served as bishop of the Roman Catholic Diocese of Yongjia, China, from 2010 to 2016.

Notes

1927 births
2016 deaths
21st-century Roman Catholic bishops in China
People from Yongjia County
People of the Republic of China